Courcelles may refer to:

Places

Belgium
 Courcelles, Belgium, a municipality located in the province of Hainaut

Canada
 Courcelles, Quebec, a municipality

France
 Courcelles, Charente-Maritime
 Courcelles, Doubs
 Courcelles, Meurthe-et-Moselle
 Courcelles, Nièvre
 Courcelles, Territoire de Belfort
 Courcelles-au-Bois, in the department of Somme
 Courcelles-Chaussy, in the department of Moselle
 Courcelles-de-Touraine, in the department of Indre-et-Loire
 Courcelles-en-Barrois, in the department of Meuse
 Courcelles-en-Bassée, in the department of Seine-et-Marne
 Courcelles-en-Montagne, in the department of Haute-Marne
 Courcelles-Epayelles, in the department of Oise
 Courcelles-Frémoy, in the department of Côte-d'Or
 Courcelles-la-Forêt, in the department of Sarthe
 Courcelles-le-Comte, in the department of Pas-de-Calais
 Courcelles-le-Roi, in the department of Loiret
 Courcelles-lès-Gisors, in the department of Oise
 Courcelles-lès-Lens, in the department of Pas-de-Calais
 Courcelles-lès-Montbard, in the department of Côte-d'Or
 Courcelles-lès-Montbéliard, in the department of Doubs
 Courcelles-lès-Semur, in the department of Côte-d'Or
 Courcelles-Sapicourt, in the department of Marne
 Courcelles-sous-Châtenois, in the department of Vosges
 Courcelles-sous-Moyencourt, in the department of Somme
 Courcelles-sous-Thoix, in the department of Somme
 Courcelles-sur-Aire, in the department of Meuse
 Courcelles-sur-Blaise, in the department of Haute-Marne
 Courcelles-sur-Nied, in the department of Moselle
 Courcelles-sur-Seine, in the department of Eure
 Courcelles-sur-Vesles, in the department of Aisne
 Courcelles-sur-Viosne, in the department of Val-d'Oise
 Courcelles-sur-Voire, in the department of Aube
 Courcelles (Paris Métro), a metro station

Family name 
 Anne-Thérèse de Marguenat de Courcelles
 Daniel de Rémy de Courcelle (or Courcelles), French governor of Canada (1665-1672)
 Didier de Chaffoy de Courcelles
 Étienne de Courcelles
 Gérard de Courcelles
 Johann Gabriel Chasteler de Courcelles
 Simon Courcelles

See also
Corcelles (disambiguation)